The 12203 / 04 Saharsa Amritsar Garib Rath Express is a Superfast Express train of the Garib Rath category belonging to Indian Railways - Northern Railway zone that runs between Saharsa Junction and Amritsar Junction in India.

It operates as train number 12203 from Saharsa Junction to Amritsar Junction and as train number 12204 in the reverse direction serving the states of Bihar, Uttar Pradesh, Delhi, Haryana & Punjab.

This train was the 1st of the Garib Rath Express series to be introduced by the then Railway Minister of India Mr. Laloo Prasad Yadav.

Coaches

The 12203 / 04 Saharsa Amritsar Garib Rath Express has 13 AC 3 tier, 4 AC Chair Car & 2 End on Generator Coaches. It does not carry a Pantry car coach.

As is customary with most train services in India, Coach Composition may be amended at the discretion of Indian Railways depending on demand.

Service

As the average speed of the train is above , as per Indian Railways rules, its fare includes a Superfast surcharge.

Routeing

The 12203 / 04 Saharsa Amritsar Garib Rath Express runs from Saharsa Junction via Barauni Junction, Samastipur Junction, Muzaffarpur Junction, Gorakhpur Junction, Basti railway station, Lucknow NR, Bareilly, New Delhi, Ambala Cant Junction, Ludhiana Junction to Amritsar Junction.

Traction

The train is powered by a WAP-4 or WAP-1 electric locomotive from Ghaziabad or Ludhiana loco sheds.

Timings

12203 Saharsa Amritsar Garib Rath Express leaves Saharsa Junction every Monday, Thursday & Sunday at 15:00 hrs IST and reaches Amritsar Junction at 21:00 hrs IST the next day.

12204 Amritsar Saharsa Garib Rath Express leaves Amritsar Junction every Wednesday, Saturday & Sunday at 04:30 hrs IST and reaches Saharsa Junction at 10:10 hrs IST the next day.

References 

 http://www.indianrail.gov.in/garibrath_trn_list.html
 https://www.youtube.com/watch?v=dLEx8giVZd4
 https://www.youtube.com/watch?v=bAmyqO0wjW4
 http://timesofindia.indiatimes.com/city/patna/Saharsa-Amritsar-Garib-Rath-route-changed/articleshow/589333.cms
 http://www.mouthshut.com/review/Garib-Rath-Express-review-tmrslmoqor
 https://www.flickr.com/photos/ankitwap7/5246137954/
 http://tech.firstpost.com/watch-videos/irfca-2203-saharsa-amritsar-garib-rath-express-speeds-through-adarsh-nagar-_hTWkTRV3Qkg.html
 http://archive.indianexpress.com/news/garib-rath-not-cheap-enough-for-bihar-s-poor/15131/

External links

Rail transport in Bihar
Rail transport in Uttar Pradesh
Rail transport in Delhi
Rail transport in Haryana
Rail transport in Punjab, India
Garib Rath Express trains
Transport in Amritsar
Transport in Saharsa